Regina Marunde (born 26 August 1968) is a German cyclist. She competed in the women's cross-country mountain biking event at the 1996 Summer Olympics.

References

External links
 

1968 births
Living people
German female cyclists
Olympic cyclists of Germany
Cyclists at the 1996 Summer Olympics
Cyclists from Berlin
German mountain bikers